Peter Millar is a premium American lifestyle brand founded in 2001 in Raleigh, North Carolina which produces  casual sportswear, tailored dress furnishings, luxury and performance golf attire for men and women. The company maintains its headquarters in Raleigh, North Carolina and is an owned subsidiary of Compagnie Financière Richemont SA.

History

Early History 
Peter Millar was founded in 2001 by Greg Oakley, Chet Sikorski and Chris Knott. The company's name was inspired by an inscription Knott discovered on an antique lawn bowling ball given to him by his mother.

In 2005, Scott Mahoney, a former executive at Polo Ralph Lauren, teamed with Sea Island Company to purchase Peter Millar and then took leadership as chief executive officer.

In 2007, Peter Millar signed a license agreement with Empire Clothing of Canada for the manufacturing and distribution of Peter Millar's tailored clothing line.

In 2009, Winona Capital Management, a Chicago-based private equity firm, purchased a majority interest in Peter Millar from the Sea Island Company.

In January 2010 Todd Martin, joined the team as president of Peter Millar Golf, with over 16 years of experience in the better golf apparel market, formerly serving as president of Fairway & Greene Inc.

In 2011, Peter Millar moved its design and marketing headquarters to a new showroom in downtown Raleigh, North Carolina, and opened a warehouse space and offices in Durham, North Carolina.

Growth 
In 2012, Peter Millar was acquired by Richemont SA, a Swiss-based luxury goods holding company whose brands include Cartier (jeweler), Van Cleef & Arpels, Montblanc (company), Vacheron Constantin, and Jaeger-LeCoultre.

In March 2015, founder Chris Knott announced his retirement.

In February 2015 Jason Cater takes on role as vice-president of Design and Merchandising. Cater was previously of Ermenegildo Zegna where he was vice president of wholesale for Ermenegildo Zegna Sportswear, Shoes, and Leather Goods.

May 2017, Peter Millar introduces collaboration with G/FORE footwear. This new range combines G/FORE's custom design and golf footwear expertise with classic Peter Millar styling in custom colours.

January 2018, Peter Millar announced they had acquired Los Angeles-based G/FORE, a golf inspired sportswear and accessories brand.

Stores 

In 2011, Peter Millar opened its first company-owned retail store in Southampton, New York, followed by a retail store in Palm Beach, Florida, on iconic Worth Avenue.

In late 2014, Peter Millar opened a flagship retail store in New York at 536 Madison Avenue.

Shortly afterward, it opened a retail store in Austin, Texas, at The Domain Shopping Center.

In September 2015, the brand opened a store in Raleigh's North Hills.

In December 2015, Peter Millar opened a store in partnership with Andrisen Morton, a high-end menswear clothier in Denver.

Peter Millar opened a shopping destination in Atlanta in January 2016. The store involves a targeted partnership with long-time industry veterans Robby Miller and Greg Miller of Miller Brothers, a high-end menswear clothier in Atlanta. The 1,250 square ft. store is located in the heart of Alpharetta at the Avalon Shopping Center.

In June 2017, Peter Millar opened a location in Dallas’ newest urban village Legacy West.

August 2017, Peter Millar partnered with Eric Viars of the Oxford Shop to open a new location in Brentwood's Hill Center.

In September 2017, Peter Millar opened a luxury apparel boutique within the Broadmoor Resort in Colorado Spring, Colorado. This is the second retail location Peter Millar will open with long-time menswear industry veterans Craig Andrisen and Dave Morton of Andrisen Morton.

In July 2018 Peter Millar opened a location in Miramar Beach, Florida in partnership with George Bass of New Orleans, a prominent menswear store.

In May 2018 Peter Millar opened a location in Boston, MA. The store was opened in partnership with Mahi Gold.

Peter Millar opened a location in Charlotte, NC in partnership with Paul Simon Co. in September 2018. The store is located in Charlotte's SouthPark area.

In March 2019 Peter Millar opened a location in partnership with Gary's, a high-end menswear store. The store sits in the Fashion Island shopping center in Newport Beach, CA.

Peter Millar opened their newest location in April 2019 in Chicago. This flagship location is the brand's largest store in the country to date.  

Peter Millar is also carried in golf clubs and specialty retail stores across the world as well as select Nordstrom, Neiman Marcus and Saks Fifth Avenue.

In November 2019, Peter Millar opened their newest location in Palmetto Bluff.

Brand Ambassadors

Current Brand Ambassadors 

 PGA Tour Player Brandt Snedeker
PGA Tour Player Patton Kizzire
 PGA Tour Player Bill Haas
 PGA Tour Player Scott Brown
 PGA Tour Player Shawn Stefani
 PGA Tour Player Chesson Hadley
 PGA Tour Player Chez Reavie
 PGA Tour Player Hudson Swafford
 PGA Tour Player Johnson Wagner
 PGA Tour Player Branden Grace
PGA Tour Player Danny Lee
PGA Tour Player Hank Lebioda
PGA Tour Player Josh Teater
PGA Tour Player Harris English
PGA Tour Player Kevin Kisner
PGA Tour Player Akshay Bhatia
 Web.com Tour Player Dru Love
 Web.com tour Rick Lamb
 Web.com tour Brett Quigley   
 European Tour Player Ben Evans
European Tour Player Robert MacIntyre
 European Tour Player George Coetzee
 European Tour Player Jamie Donaldson
 European Tour Player Oliver Wilson
European Tour Player Harry Hall
Asian Tour Player Panuphol Pittayarat
PGA Tour Champions Player David Toms
PGA Tour Champions Player Kevin Tanigawa
 Golf Channel's Morning Drive host Gary Williams
Collegiate Player Cameron Young
Collegiate Player Steven Fisk
Collegiate Player Cole Hammer

Notable Information 
The brand's motto is “Live a life of style & substance".

Every Peter Millar shipment includes a signature mint inside the box.

Golf Channel's Morning Drive host Gary Williams is a brand advocate and ambassador.

ESPN college basketball analyst Jay Bilas wears tailored suits and dress furnishings by Peter Millar.

In 2011, United States Presidents Cup Captain, Fred Couples, choose Peter Millar to outfit the entire U.S. team for the 2011 matches in Melbourne, Australia.

In 2013, the brand was selected as the official apparel provider for the International Team at The Presidents Cup 2013 in Dublin, Ohio.

In 2015, the brand was selected as the official apparel provider for the International Team at The Presidents Cup, held in Songdo IBD, South Korea, in October 2015.

References 

Clothing companies of the United States
Clothing companies established in 2001
Retail companies established in 2001
American companies established in 2001
Companies based in Raleigh, North Carolina